Artigas is a Caracas Metro station on Line 2. It was opened on 6 November 1988 as part of the extension of the line from La Paz to El Silencio. The station is between Maternidad and La Paz.

References

Caracas Metro stations
1988 establishments in Venezuela
Railway stations opened in 1988